A city gate is a gate which is, or was, set within a city wall

Places

Gates
City Gate, Chittagong, a gate located in Chittagong, southeastern Bangladesh
City gates of Paris in French "portes de Paris", access points to the city of Paris for pedestrians and other road users
City Gate (Valletta), a gate located at the entrance of Valletta, Malta
Martin city gate, one of three still existing city gates of Cochem, Germany

Other places
City Gate (Frankfurt), a skyscraper in the Nordend-West district of Frankfurt, Germany
City Gate (Port of Spain), the main terminal for the buses and maxi taxis in Port of Spain, Trinidad and Tobago
City Gate Mahon, office and medical complex in Mahon, Cork, Ireland
City Gate Towers (Romanian: Turnurile "Porţile Oraşului"), two office buildings in Bucharest, Romania
Eastern City Gate (Serbian: Istočna Kapija Beograda), a complex of three large residential buildings in Belgrade, Serbia
Western City Gate (Serbian: Zapadna Kapija Beograda), a skyscraper in Belgrade, Serbia

Other uses
City Gates (album), a 1983 album by the George Adams-Don Pullen Quartet

See also
Moshe Aviv Tower, commonly known as City Gate (Hebrew: שער העיר), its original name
Gate City (disambiguation)